Ruine Hauenstein is a castle in Styria, Austria. Ruine Hauenstein is situated at an elevation of 656 m.

See also
List of castles in Austria

References

This article was initially translated from the German Wikipedia.

Castles in Styria

de:Ruine Hauenstein